Actionism may refer to:

Viennese Actionism, a school of art which started in Vienna, Austria
A term used by Theodor W. Adorno to refer to the left-wing anti-intellectualism
An excessive emphasis on social action, activity, or change in lieu of continuity, stability, and permanence